A joint dislocation, also called luxation, occurs when there is an abnormal separation in the joint, where two or more bones meet. A partial dislocation is referred to as a subluxation. Dislocations are often caused by sudden trauma on the joint like an impact or fall. A joint dislocation can cause damage to the surrounding ligaments, tendons, muscles, and nerves. Dislocations can occur in any major joint (shoulder, knees, etc.) or minor joint (toes, fingers, etc.). The most common joint dislocation is a shoulder dislocation.

Treatment for joint dislocation is usually by closed reduction, that is, skilled manipulation to return the bones to their normal position. Reduction should only be performed by trained medical professionals, because it can cause injury to soft tissue and/or the nerves and vascular structures around the dislocation.

Symptoms and signs
The following symptoms are common with any type of dislocation.
 Intense pain
 Joint instability
 Deformity of the joint area
 Reduced muscle strength
 Bruising or redness of joint area
 Difficulty moving joint
 Stiffness

Causes

Joint dislocations are caused by trauma to the joint or when an individual falls on a specific joint. Great and sudden force applied, by either a blow or fall, to the joint can cause the bones in the joint to be displaced or dislocated from normal position. With each dislocation, the ligaments keeping the bones fixed in the correct position can be damaged or loosened, making it easier for the joint to be dislocated in the future.

Some individuals are prone to dislocations due to congenital conditions, such as hypermobility syndrome and Ehlers-Danlos Syndrome. Hypermobility syndrome is genetically inherited disorder that is thought to affect the encoding of the connective tissue protein’s collagen in the ligament of joints. The loosened or stretched ligaments in the joint provide little stability and allow for the joint to be easily dislocated.

Diagnosis
Initial evaluation of a suspected joint dislocation should begin with a thorough patient history, including mechanism of injury, and physical examination. Special attention should be focused on the neurovascular exam both before and after reduction, as injury to these structures may occur during the injury or during the reduction process. Subsequent imaging studies are frequently obtained to assist with diagnosis.
 Standard plain radiographs, usually a minimum of 2 views
 Generally, pre- and post-reduction X-rays are recommended. Initial X-ray can confirm the diagnosis as well as evaluate for any concomitant fractures. Post-reduction radiographs confirm successful reduction alignment and can exclude any other bony injuries that may have been caused during the reduction procedure.
 In certain instances if initial X-rays are normal but injury is suspected, there is possible benefit of stress/weight-bearing views to further assess for disruption of ligamentous structures and/or need for surgical intervention. This may be utilized with AC joint separations.
 Nomenclature: Joint dislocations are named based on the distal component in relation to the proximal one.
 Ultrasound
 Ultrasound may be useful in an acute setting, particularly with suspected shoulder dislocations. Although it may not be as accurate in detecting any associated fractures, in one observational study ultrasonography identified 100% of shoulder dislocations, and was 100% sensitive in identifying successful reduction when compared to plain radiographs.  Ultrasound may also have utility in diagnosing AC joint dislocations.
 In infants <6 months of age with suspected developmental dysplasia of the hip (congenital hip dislocation), ultrasound is the imaging study of choice as the proximal femoral epiphysis has not significantly ossified at this age.
 Cross-sectional imaging (CT or MRI)
 Plain films are generally sufficient in making a joint dislocation diagnosis. However, cross-sectional imaging can subsequently be used to better define and evaluate abnormalities that may be missed or not clearly seen on plain X-rays. CT is useful in further analyzing any bony aberrations, and CT angiogram may be utilized if vascular injury is suspected. In addition to improved visualization of bony abnormalities, MRI permits for a more detailed inspection of the joint-supporting structures in order to assess for ligamentous and other soft tissue injury.

Treatment
A dislocated joint usually can be successfully reduced into its normal position only by a trained medical professional. Trying to reduce a joint without any training could substantially worsen the injury.

X-rays are usually taken to confirm a diagnosis and detect any fractures which may also have occurred at the time of dislocation. A dislocation is easily seen on an X-ray.

Once a diagnosis is confirmed, the joint is usually manipulated back into position.  This can be a very painful process, therefore this is typically done either in the emergency department under sedation or in an operating room under a general anaesthetic.

It is important the joint is reduced as soon as possible, as in the state of dislocation, the blood supply to the joint (or distal anatomy) may be compromised.  This is especially true in the case of a dislocated ankle, due to the anatomy of the blood supply to the foot.

Shoulder injuries can also be surgically stabilized, depending on the severity, using arthroscopic surgery. The most common treatment method for a dislocation of the Glenohumeral Joint (GH Joint/Shoulder Joint) is exercise based management. Another method of treatment is to place the injured arm in a sling or in another immobilizing device in order to keep the joint stable.

Some joints are more at risk of becoming dislocated again after an initial injury.  This is due to the weakening of the muscles and ligaments which hold the joint in place.  The shoulder is a prime example of this.  Any shoulder dislocation should be followed up with thorough physiotherapy.

On field reduction is crucial for joint dislocations. As they are extremely common in sports events, managing them correctly at the game at the time of injury, can reduce long term issues. They require prompt evaluation, diagnosis, reduction, and postreduction management before the person can be evaluated at a medical facility.

After care
After a dislocation, injured joints are usually held in place by a splint (for straight joints like fingers and toes) or a bandage (for complex joints like shoulders).  Additionally, the joint muscles, tendons and ligaments must also be strengthened. This is usually done through a course of physiotherapy, which will also help reduce the chances of repeated dislocations of the same joint.

For glenohumeral instability, the therapeutic program depends on specific characteristics of the instability pattern, severity, recurrence and direction with adaptations made based on the needs of the patient. In general, the therapeutic program should focus on restoration of strength, normalization of range of motion and optimization of flexibility and muscular performance. Throughout all stages of the rehabilitation program, it is important to take all related joints and structures into consideration.

Epidemiology
 Each joint in the body can be dislocated, however, there are common sites where most dislocations occur. The following structures are the most common sites of joint dislocations:
 Dislocated shoulder
 Shoulder dislocations account for 45% of all dislocation visits to the emergency room. Anterior shoulder dislocation, the most common type of shoulder dislocation (96-98% of the time) occurs when the arm is in external rotation and abduction (away from the body) produces a force that displaces the humeral head anteriorly and downwardly. Vessel and nerve injuries during a shoulder dislocation is rare, but can cause many impairments and requires a longer recovery process. There is a 39% average rate of recurrence of anterior shoulder dislocation, with age, sex, hyperlaxity and greater tuberosity fractures being the key risk factors.
 Knee: Patellar dislocation
 Many different knee injuries can happen. Three percent of knee injuries are acute traumatic patellar dislocations. Because dislocations make the knee unstable, 15% of patellas will re-dislocate.
 Patellar dislocations occur when the knee is in full extension and sustains a trauma from the lateral to medial side.
 Elbow: Posterior dislocation, 90% of all elbow dislocations
 Wrist: Lunate and Perilunate dislocation most common
 Finger: Interphalangeal (IP) or metacarpophalangeal (MCP) joint dislocations
 In the United States, men are most likely to sustain a finger dislocation with an incidence rate of 17.8 per 100,000 person-years. Women have an incidence rate of 4.65 per 100,000 person-years. The average age group that sustain a finger dislocation are between 15 and 19 years old.
 Hip: Posterior and anterior dislocation of hip
 Anterior dislocations are less common than posterior dislocations. 10% of all dislocations are anterior and this is broken down into superior and inferior types. Superior dislocations account for 10% of all anterior dislocations, and inferior dislocations account for 90%. 16-40 year old males are more likely to receive dislocations due to a car accident. When an individual receives a hip dislocation, there is an incidence rate of 95% that they will receive an injury to another part of their body as well. 46–84% of hip dislocations occur secondary to traffic accidents, the remaining percentage is due based on falls, industrial accidents or sporting injury.
 Foot and Ankle:
 Lisfranc injury is a dislocation or fracture-dislocation injury at the tarsometatarsal joints
 Subtalar dislocation, or talocalcaneonavicular dislocation, is a simultaneous dislocation of the talar joints at the talocalcaneal and talonavicular levels. Subtalar dislocations without associated fractures represent about 1% of all traumatic injuries of the foot and 1-2 % of all dislocations, and they are associated with high energy trauma. Early closed reduction is recommended, otherwise open reduction without further delay.
 Total talar dislocation is very rare and has very high rates of complications.
 Ankle Sprains primarily occur as a result of tearing the ATFL (anterior talofibular ligament) in the Talocrural Joint. The ATFL tears most easily when the foot is in plantarflexion and inversion.
 Ankle dislocation without fracture is rare.

Gallery

See also
 Buddy wrapping
 Major trauma
 Physical therapy
 Projectional radiography
 Listhesis, olisthesis, or olisthy

References

External links 

 

Contortion
Joints
Dislocations, sprains and strains
Emergency medical procedures